Cansahcab Municipality (In the Yucatec Maya Language: "Place of the four white caves") is a small (146.90 km²) municipalities in the Mexican state of Yucatán located roughly 50 km southeast of the state capital of Mérida.

History
Before the arrival of the Spanish, the area belonged to the chieftainship of Ah Kin Chel. After the conquest the area became part of the encomienda system. One of the encomenderas was Bantulia Sosa de Rivero, who in 1700 had responsibility entrusted for the care of 250 indigenous inhabitants.

Yucatán declared its independence from the Spanish Crown in 1821 and in 1825, the area was assigned to the Izamal Municipality. In 1913 it was designated as its own municipality.

Governance
The municipal president is elected for a three-year term. The town council has four councilpersons, who serve as Secretary and councilors of ecology, public services and public security.

Communities
The head of the municipality is Cansahcab, Yucatán.  The other populated areas of the municipality include Ayala, Ekbalám, Kancabchén, San Antonio Xíat, San Isidro, San Pedro, Santa María, and Uchanchá. The significant populations are shown below:

Local festivals
Every year from 14 – 16 September, Cansahcab holds an annual fair or "fiesta del pueblo" during which an impromptu bullfighting ring is set up to host much of the festivities which include a charrería, bullfighting and folkloric dancing. On 4 October, a feast is held in honor of St. Francis of Assisi, patron saint of the town.

Notables
Notable locals include General Teodosio Canto who was governor of the state of Yucatán from 1882-1886.

Tourist attractions
 Former Convent and Church of  St. Francis of Assisi, built in the seventeenth century
 Cenote Bohchen
 Cenote Hu-Can-Ha
 Cenote Popola

References

Municipalities of Yucatán